A Dublin City Council election was held in Ireland on 23 May 2014 as part of that year's local elections. Sixty-three councillors were elected for a five-year term of office from nine local electoral areas by proportional representation with a single transferable vote.

Dublin City Council was expanded to 63 seats for the 2014 elections. Sinn Féin won 16 seats, a gain of 7 seats, to emerge as the largest party and at least 1 seat in every LEA except Rathgar-Rathmines. Fianna Fáil won 9 seats, a gain of 3 seats in total. The party won 2 seats in Clontarf and 1 seat in every LEA except the North-Inner City. Fine Gael lost 4 seats to return with 8 seats overall. The party won 2 seats in Pembroke-Southdock and Rathgar-Rathmines but found itself without representation in Ballyfermot-Drimnagh, Cabra-Finglas and Crumlin-Kimmage. The Labour Party had a terrible election losing 11 seats in all, including their outgoing Lord Mayor, Oisin Quinn, to return with just 8 councillors in all. People Before Profit gained 3 seats to return with 5 seats in all and the Green Party made a return to the council with 3 seats. The United Left and the Anti-Austerity Alliance both returned 1 seat while Independents doubled their numbers to 12 seats.

Results by party

Results by Electoral Area

Ballyfermot-Drimnagh

Ballymun

Beaumont-Donaghmede

Cabra-Finglas

Clontarf

Crumlin-Kimmage

North Inner City

Pembroke-South Dock

Rathgar-Rathmines

Changes since 2014

References

External links 
 https://www.housing.gov.ie/sites/default/files/publications/files/local_elections_2014_results_book.pdf
 
 http://irelandelection.com/council.php?elecid=157&tab=constit&detail=yes&electype=5&councilid=7&electype=5

Dublin City Council election
2014
City Council election, 2014
Dublin City Council election
Dublin City Council election